Benny Gaughran may refer to:

 Benny Gaughran (footballer, born 1915) (1915–1977), Irish soccer player
 Benny Gaughran (Gaelic footballer) (born 1945), his son, solicitor and Gaelic footballer